Club Natació Barcelona is a Spanish multi-sports club from Barcelona established in 1907. It is active in athletics, diving, karate, petanca, pilota, rugby, sailing, swimming, water polo, and triathlon.

Barcelona is the most successful club in Spanish water polo history with overall 59 national titles (40 Spanish Championships and 19 Spanish Leagues). The club has also won European Cup in 1982 and the LEN Trophy in 1995 and 2004.

Titles
European Cup (1)
1982
LEN Trophy (2)
1995, 2004
Spanish Championship (40)
1912, 1913, 1914, 1915, 1916, 1917, 1918, 1919, 1920, 1921, 1942, 1943, 1944, 1945, 1946, 1947, 1948, 1949, 1950, 1951, 1952, 1953, 1954, 1955, 1956, 1957, 1958, 1959, 1960, 1961, 1962, 1963, 1964, 1965, 1966, 1967, 1968, 1969, 1970, 1971
Spanish League (19)
1965–66, 1966–67, 1967–68, 1968–69, 1970–71, 1971–72, 1974–75, 1979–80, 1980–81, 1981–82, 1982–83, 1986–87, 1990–91, 1994–95, 1995–96, 1996–97, 2001–02, 2003–04, 2004–05
Copa del Rey (8)
1989, 1991, 1995, 1996, 1999, 2002, 2003, 2011

References

External links
Official website

Water polo clubs in Catalonia
Sports clubs in Barcelona
Sports clubs established in 1907